Yoshioki Hasegawa (3 March 1892 – 20 February 1974) was a Japanese sculptor. His work was part of the art competitions at the 1932 Summer Olympics and the 1936 Summer Olympics.

References

1892 births
1974 deaths
20th-century Japanese sculptors
Japanese sculptors
Olympic competitors in art competitions
People from Toyama Prefecture